Yilong Cave is a 180-million-year-old karst cave located in Pingxiang City, Jiangxi Province, People's Republic of China. Inside there are unusual rock formations, small streams and waterfalls.

See also
List of caves in China
List of longest caves

References

Caves of Jiangxi
Karst caves
Karst formations of China
Show caves in China
Tourist attractions in Jiangxi